Northern Khmer, also called Surin Khmer, is the dialect of the Khmer language spoken by  approximately 1.4 million Khmers native to the Thai provinces of Surin, Sisaket, Buriram and Roi Et as well as those that have migrated from this region into Cambodia.

Northern Khmer differs from the standard language, based on a dialect of Central Khmer, in the number and variety of vowel phonemes, consonantal distribution, lexicon, grammar, and, most notably, pronunciation of syllable-final , giving Northern Khmer a distinct accent easily recognizable by speakers of other dialects.  Some speakers of Northern Khmer may understand other varieties of Khmer but speakers of standard Khmer who have not been exposed to Northern Khmer often have trouble understanding Northern Khmer at first. The two varieties are 80–85% cognate on a basic 270-word list. These facts have led some linguists to advocate considering Northern Khmer a separate, but closely related language.

History

After the fall of the Khmer Empire in the early 15th century the Dongrek Mountains served as a natural border, leaving the Khmer north of the mountains increasingly under the sphere of influence of Lan Xang. The conquests of Cambodia by Naresuan the Great for Ayutthaya furthered the political and economic isolation from Cambodia proper, leading to a dialect that developed relatively independently from the midpoint of the Middle Khmer period.

Subsequently, the Isan area was claimed by the Lao Kingdom of Champasak in 1718 and in 1893, the region became part of the Kingdom of Siam (Thailand) as a result of the Franco-Siamese War. Throughout this period, the Northern Khmer people shared the rural mountainous highlands with the Lao, Thai and various Mon-Khmer groups such as the Kuy, leading to a high degree of multilingualism. These varied influences and unique history have resulted in a distinct accent, with characteristics of the surrounding tonal languages, lexical differences through borrowing from Lao, Kuy and Thai, and phonemic differences in both vowels and distribution of consonants.

Status
Most, or probably all, speakers of Northern Khmer are bilingual, being also proficient in the national language Thai, which is the sole language of education and mass communication. Usage of Northern Khmer is restricted to the domestic and village domain. In the past, its use was actively disfavored (e.g. by prohibiting speaking Northern Khmer in school classrooms) to boost proficiency in the national language. Only a few (c. 1,000) speakers of Northern Khmer are able to read or write it.

Demographics

Phonology
Northern Khmer has the typical Mon-Khmer consonant and syllable structure although there is no phonemic phonation.  The primary divergences from Central Khmer phonology are in the realizations of some syllable-final consonants and in the vowel inventory. Northern Khmer is also losing the sesquisyllabic pattern of its sister languages. Many dysllables have lost all but the first consonant of the pre-syllable, creating a great number of consonant clusters.  In many dialects of Northern Khmer, however, inserting a generic syllable, after an initial consonant is still optional, returning some words to their original sesquisyllabic structure.

Consonants
The consonant inventory of Northern Khmer is identical to that of Central Khmer. It is laid out below as reported by Thomas.

Syllable-initial consonants are pronounced as in Central Khmer. Additionally, as mentioned above, syllable-final  which has become silent in all other dialects is markedly pronounced. Clusters often have anaptyxis, the insertion of slight vowel (shown with ).

Vowels

The biggest distinction between Northern Khmer of Thailand and Central Khmer of Cambodia is in the inventory of vowel phonemes. Smalley described 14 pure vowels that occur both long and short.

All 17 vowels can be short or long. With 14 basic vowel positions, and having more back vowels than front, Northern Khmer is atypical. By contrast, standard Central Khmer only has 9 or 10 basic vowel positions, depending on the analysis.

Script
Northern Khmer is, for the most part, a spoken language as most speakers are unable to read or write their native tongue due to Thaification policies either enacted or supported by the Thai government.  However, recent renewed interest and enthusiasm in Khmer language and culture has resulted in a two-fold increase in the use of Northern Khmer since 1958 and the consequential need for a formalized method of writing the language. Since the Thai language is the medium of public education and, until the 21st century, the media, Khmer is taught at home or by monks in the local Khmer temples, often supported by Khmers in Cambodia or Western nations.

In Thailand, Northern Khmer is written in the Thai script. As many sounds occur in Northern Khmer that would be impossible to write according to the rules of Thai orthography, a few innovations are necessary such as using ฮ (initial /h/ in Thai) at the end of words to represent syllable-final /h/ and ญ (initial , final  in Thai) to represent Northern Khmer's palatal nasal /ɲ/.  Special diacritics are also sometimes used with the vowels because Northern Khmer has more vowel positions than Thai.

Within Cambodia, Northern Khmer is written in the Khmer script as the words are spelled in standard Khmer, regardless of the Northern Khmer pronunciation. This is seen most often in the context of kantrum music karaoke DVDs which are increasingly popular in Cambodia and with Cambodians overseas.

" ฺ " (the pinthu mark) or " ํ " are used to alter the pronunciation of vowels, similar to the bântăk punctuation mark (a small vertical line on the final consonant of a syllable) in the Khmer alphabet.

See also
Cambodia
Chrieng Brunh
Isan
Khmer language
Khmer people
Kantrum
Northern Khmer people
Thailand

References

Further reading

 Thanan Čhanthrupant, and Chātchāi Phromčhakkarin. Photčhanānukrom Khamen (Surin)-Thai-Angkrit = Khmer (Surin)-Thai-English Dictionary. [Bangkok, Thailand]: Indigenous Languages of Thailand Research project, Chulalongkorn University Language Institute, 1978.
 Suwilai Prēmsīrat, and Sōphanā Sīčhampā. Kānphatthanā rabop kānkhīan Phāsā Khamēn Thin Thai Khrōngkān Phatthanā Phāsā Phư̄nbān phư̄a ʻAnurak Sinlapawatthanatham Phư̄nbān læ Phalit Sư̄ Tāng Tāng = Formulating Thai-based northern Khmer orthography : for the recording and preservation of local culture and for the producing of educational materials. [Bangkok]: Sathāban Wičhai Phāsā læ Watthanatham phư̄a Phatthanā Chonnabot, Mahāwitthayālai Mahidon, 1990.

External links
Thailand’s Khmer as 'Invisible Minority': Language, Ethnicity and Cultural Politics in North-Eastern Thailand
The Cambodian Language in Thailand
Description of Khmer: Lecture by Paul Sidwell of Australian National University

Languages of Cambodia
Languages of Thailand
Khmer language